Acrida ungarica is a species of grasshopper found in southern and central Europe. It is commonly known as the (common) cone-headed grasshopper, nosed grasshopper, and Mediterranean slant-faced grasshopper.

Two subspecies are recognized:
Acrida ungarica mediterranea Dirsh, 1949
Acrida ungarica ungarica (Herbst, 1786)

Gallery

References

ungarica
Orthoptera of Europe
Insects described in 1786